Gaighat is an administrative centre within Triyuga Municipality and the headquarter of Udayapur District located in Province No. 1 of Nepal. Gaighat is divided into 2 wards called Gaighat Bazar and Old Gaighat. The Gaighat (Gaighat Bazar) is located in Ward No. 11 and Old Gaighat is in Ward No. 12 of Triyuga Municipality.

Background
The headquarter of Udayapur District was situated on the hill of Udayapurgadhi in Panchawati village before 1972. Government took decision to move the headquarter to the plain of Gaighat in 1972 and in 1972 it moved to Gaighat. It was a Village development committee until 1997. It incorporated to Triyuga Municipality along with Deuri and Bhumarashuwa on 26 March 1997.

At the time of the 1991 Nepal census it had a population of 12,132 people living in 2319 individual households.

Transportation

The town in connected to Indian border via Thadi in Nepal and Laukaha in India which is 51 km South of Gaighat are a part of one of the agreed route for Mutual Trade between India and Nepal. Nepal Government of Nepal has set up a dedicated customs office in the town. and Government of India has set up a Land Customs Station with a Superintendent level officer. So in simple Import and Export are allowed in this location.  
Laukaha has Laukaha Bazar railway station which is a big line and connects to rest of India.

Administration

See also
Jogidaha
Saune

References

Populated places in Udayapur District
Triyuga Municipality
Wards and electoral divisions of Nepal